Isaiah Neyor is an American football wide receiver for the Texas Longhorns. He previously played at Wyoming.

Early life and high school
Neyor grew up in Fort Worth, Texas and attended Lamar High School. As a senior he had 39 receptions for 858 yards and eight touchdowns. Neyor committed to play college football at Wyoming over offers from FCS programs Incarnate Word and Western Illinois and from Division II Henderson State.

College career
Neyor played in one game as a true freshman while redshirting the season. As a redshirt freshman, he caught eight passes for 248 yards for an average of 31 yards in six games played. Neyor was named second team All-Mountain West Conference in 2021 after finishing the season with 44 receptions for 878 yards and 12 touchdowns. Following the end of the season, he entered his name into the NCAA transfer portal. Neyor initially committed to transfer to the University of Tennessee after considering offers from Ole Miss and USC Trojans. He flipped his commitment to the University of Texas and signed with the school two weeks after his commitment to Tennessee.

Neyor suffered a torn anterior cruciate ligament during preseason training camp entering his first season at Texas.

Collegiate statistics

Source:

References

External links
Wyoming Cowboys bio

Living people
Players of American football from Texas
American football wide receivers
Texas Longhorns football players
Wyoming Cowboys football players
Year of birth missing (living people)